Oliver Palotai (born 17 March 1974) is a German musician, best known as a member of the power metal band Kamelot and of Doro Pesch's touring band.

Career
He made his name playing keyboards and guitar for Doro and keyboards for Circle II Circle (as a touring member between 2003 and 2004) before joining Blaze Bayley's BLAZE as a replacement for founding guitarist John Slater in 2004. In 2005 he joined the power metal band Kamelot as a touring keyboard player, and was soon welcomed as a permanent member. Palotai left BLAZE in January 2007. He later formed his own band, Sons of Seasons. releasing albums in 2009 and 2011. He also played keyboards for the Dutch symphonic metal band Epica on their 2010 North American tour.

Personal life
Palotai has diplomas as both a music teacher and a professional musician from Hochschule für Musik Nürnberg-Augsburg.

He is in a relationship with Epica frontwoman Simone Simons. They got married on July 6, 2013.They announced they were expecting their first child the same year. Their son, Vincent, was born in October.

Bands
Doro (2001–2009)
Uli Jon Roth (2004–present)
 Circle II Circle – keyboards (2006–2007)
Blaze Bayley (2004–2007) – guitars
Epica (2010) – live keyboards
Kamelot (2005–present)
Sons of Seasons (2007–present)

References

External links
 

1974 births
Living people
German keyboardists
German heavy metal guitarists
German male guitarists
Heavy metal keyboardists
German people of Hungarian descent
Kamelot members
21st-century guitarists
21st-century German male musicians